Hardy Township may refer to:

Hardy Township, Holmes County, Ohio, United States
Hardy Township, Ontario, Canada

Township name disambiguation pages